Jelena Stanisavljević (born 25 August 1978) is a Serbian sprinter. She competed in the women's 4 × 400 metres relay at the 2000 Summer Olympics, representing Yugoslavia.

References

1978 births
Living people
Athletes (track and field) at the 2000 Summer Olympics
Serbian female sprinters
Yugoslav female sprinters
Olympic athletes of Yugoslavia
Place of birth missing (living people)
Olympic female sprinters